The Oireachtas, sometimes referred to as Oireachtas Éireann, is the bicameral parliament of Ireland. The Oireachtas consists of:
The President of Ireland
The two houses of the Oireachtas:
Dáil Éireann (lower house)
Seanad Éireann (upper house)

The houses of the Oireachtas sit in Leinster House in Dublin, an eighteenth-century ducal palace. The directly elected Dáil is by far the more powerful branch of the Oireachtas.

Etymology
The word  comes from the Irish word / ("deliberative assembly of freemen; assembled freemen; assembly, gathering; patrimony, territory"), ultimately from the word  ("freeman"). Its first recorded use as the name of a legislative body was within the Irish Free State.

Composition
Dáil Éireann, the lower house, is directly elected under universal suffrage of all Irish citizens who are residents and at least eighteen years old. An election is held at least once every five years as required by law; however, the house can be dissolved at any time at the request of the Taoiseach (head of government). Dáil elections use a system of proportional representation by way of a single transferable vote. The Dáil has 160 members. The Seanad is not directly elected but consists of a mixture of members selected in a number of different ways. 43 senators are elected by councillors and parliamentarians, 11 are appointed by the Taoiseach, and six are elected by two university constituencies, thus having 60 members in total. The President of Ireland is directly elected once every seven years, and may serve a maximum of two terms; however, if, as has occurred on a number of occasions, a consensus among the larger political parties can result in only a single candidate being nominated, no actual election takes place.

Role
To become law, a bill must first be approved by both the Dáil and in most circumstances the Seanad (although the Dáil can override a Seanad refusal to pass a bill), and then signed into law by the President. Bills to amend the Constitution must also be approved by the people in a referendum prior to being presented to the President. In most circumstances, the president is in effect obliged to sign all laws approved by the Houses of the Oireachtas, although the president has the power to refer most bills to the Supreme Court for a ruling on constitutionality. The powers of the Seanad are in effect limited to delay rather than veto. It is the Dáil, therefore, that is the supreme tier of the Irish legislature. The general enacting formula for Acts of the Oireachtas is: "Be it enacted by the Oireachtas as follows:—", for an act with a preamble this enacting formula is, instead, "Be it therefore enacted by the Oireachtas as follows:—".

Powers
The Oireachtas has exclusive power to:

 Legislate, including a power vested in the Dáil of approving the financial resolutions relevant to the budget. However, the courts have allowed the Oireachtas to delegate limited legislative powers to other entities, such as Government Ministers.
 Create subordinate legislatures.
 Propose changes to the constitution (must be initiated in the Dáil), which must then be submitted to a referendum.
 Raise military or armed forces.
 Allow international agreements to become part of the domestic law of the state.
 Pass certain laws having an extraterritorial effect (in accordance with the similar practices of other states).
 Enact, when it considers a state of emergency to exist, almost any law it deems necessary, with the imposition of capital punishment being the only absolutely excluded act in all circumstances.

Limitations
 Laws are invalid if, and to the extent that, they contradict the constitution.
 In the event of a conflict, EU law also takes precedence over acts of the Oireachtas, as is common throughout the European Union.
 It may not retrospectively criminalise acts that were not illegal at the time they were committed.
 It may not enact any law providing for the imposition of the death penalty, even during a state of emergency.

Committees

The Oireachtas has a number of joint committees that include members of both houses. There are currently fifteen of these:
Joint Committee on Agriculture and the Marine 
Joint Committee on Children, Disability, Equality and Integration
Joint Committee on Climate Action
Joint Committee on Education, Further and Higher Education, Research, Innovation and Science
Joint Committee on Enterprise, Trade and Employment
Joint Committee on European Union Affairs
Joint Committee on Finance, Public Expenditure and Reform, and Taoiseach
Joint Committee on Foreign Affairs and Defence
Joint Committee on Health
Joint Committee on Housing, Local Government and Heritage
Joint Committee on the Implementation of the Good Friday Agreement
Joint Committee on Justice
Joint Committee on Media, Tourism, Arts, Culture, Sport and the Gaeltacht
Joint Committee on Social Protection, Community and Rural Development and the Islands
Joint Committee on Transport and Communications Networks
Working Group of Committee Chairmen

History

Oireachtas has been the title of two parliaments in Irish history: the current Oireachtas of Ireland, since 1937, and, immediately before that, the Oireachtas of the Irish Free State of 1922–1937.

The earliest parliament in Ireland was the Parliament of Ireland, which was founded in the thirteenth century as the supreme legislative body of the lordship of Ireland and was in existence until 1801. This parliament governed the English-dominated part of Ireland, which at first was limited to Dublin and surrounding cities, but later grew to include the entire island. But the Irish Parliament was, from the passage of Poynings' Law in 1494 until its repeal in 1782, subordinate to the English, and later British, Parliament. This Parliament consisted of the King of Ireland, who was the same person as the King of England, a House of Lords and a House of Commons. In 1800 the Irish Parliament abolished itself when it adopted the Act of Union, which came into effect from 1 January 1801.

The next legislature to exist in Ireland came into being in 1919. This was a unicameral parliament established by Irish republicans, known simply as Dáil Éireann. This revolutionary Dáil was notionally a legislature for the whole island of Ireland. In 1920, in parallel to the Dáil, the British government created a home rule legislature called the Parliament of Southern Ireland. However, this parliament was boycotted by most Irish politicians. It was made up of the King, the House of Commons of Southern Ireland and the Senate of Southern Ireland. The Parliament of Southern Ireland was formally abolished in 1922, with the establishment of the Oireachtas under the Constitution of the Irish Free State.

The Oireachtas of the Irish Free State consisted officially of the King and two houses, named, as their successors would be, Dáil Éireann (described, in this case, as a 'Chamber of Deputies') and Seanad Éireann. However, the Free State Senate was abolished in 1935. The modern Oireachtas came into being in 1937, with the adoption by referendum of the Constitution of Ireland.

Broadcasting
The first Oireachtas radio and television broadcasts were of ceremonial addresses from dignitaries, beginning with that of John F. Kennedy during his 1963 state visit. Regular radio broadcasting of edited Oireachtas proceedings began in October 1986, although budget statements had already been broadcast live. Television coverage of Dáil, Seanad, and committee proceedings began in 1990, 1991, and 1993 respectively. Since 2005 the proceedings of both houses have been made available over the internet by HEAnet and the eDemocracy Unit of the Office of the Houses of the Oireachtas.

Houses of the Oireachtas Channel (publicly known as Oireachtas TV) is a digital television channel in Ireland. It broadcasts Committee and Houses and other parliament proceedings following its establishment under the Broadcasting Act 2009. On 15 November 2011, it began broadcasting a pilot service on UPC Ireland. On 22 September 2014, the Houses launched the dedicated television channel Oireachtas TV, bringing unfiltered access to the parliamentary process to over one million households nationwide. The service is available free of charge on UPC Channel 207 and Sky Channel 574.

In 2012, the Oireachtas launched its first e-consultation.

Houses of the Oireachtas family day
On 28 June 2008, the first Houses of the Oireachtas family day was held. This initiative by the then Ceann Comhairle of Dáil Éireann, John O'Donoghue and the Cathaoirleach of Seanad Éireann, Pat Moylan aimed to increase public awareness in the work of the Houses of The Oireachtas. It included tours of both chambers of the Oireachtas, lectures on the history of Oireachtas, historic political speeches recited by actors and a hot air balloon – commemorating the balloon flight which took place in 1785 from Leinster Lawn. The Oireachtas family day took place again in 2009, but it has not been held since then.

Northern Ireland representation
Although, as adopted in 1937, Article 3 of the constitution asserted the "right of the parliament and government established by this constitution to exercise jurisdiction" over the whole of Ireland, it also provided that pending the "re-integration of the national territory" Acts of the Oireachtas would not apply to Northern Ireland. Therefore, no serious attempts have been made for the representation of Northern Ireland in the Dáil. As Taoiseach, Éamon de Valera, while a staunch opponent of partition, and who had been elected to represent a Northern constituency in the First Dáil, did not pursue the idea of seats in the Dáil for Northern Ireland, on the grounds that this would amount to representation "without taxation or responsibility". Beginning with Seamus Mallon in 1982, one or more from Northern Ireland have been included among the eleven Senators nominated by the Taoiseach after most elections.

Sinn Féin has advocated that Northern Ireland MLAs, MPs, and MEPs should have the right to participate in Dáil debates, if not vote. In 2005 the Taoiseach, Bertie Ahern, proposed that Northern Ireland MPs should be able to address a committee of the whole Dáil. However, Fine Gael, the Labour Party, and Ahern's coalition partners, the Progressive Democrats, all opposed the idea, as did the Green Party, the Socialist Party and some Oireachtas members from Fianna Fáil. Only Sinn Féin, the party that stood to gain most from the proposal, supported it, while the more moderate Social Democratic and Labour Party (SDLP) described it as a step forward. The proposal was also criticised widely in the media, with an editorial in The Irish Times, declaring that: "The overwhelming democratic imperative is that the institutions of this State should represent and serve the people of the State." From 2011, Northern Ireland MEPs had the same automatic right as MEPs from the Republic to participate in meetings of the Seanad's European committee, whereas other MEPs require an invitation. This ended in 2020 when the United Kingdom left the EU, which consequently meant all UK MEPs left office.

Houses of the Oireachtas Commission
 
While each house is empowered to organise its own business, they have always co-operated in practical matters arising from the fact that they share Leinster House as a common building complex. The Houses of the Oireachtas Commission was established by statute in 2003 to provide a formal structure for this, which was previously done by a joint committee. Non-political support staff, such as ushers and the English–Irish translation staff, are employed by this Commission and treated as part of the Civil Service of the State. The Commission's chairperson and chief executive are the Ceann Comhairle and clerk of the Dáil respectively; other members are the Cathaoirleach of the Seanad, one appointed by the Minister for Finance, four by the Dáil, and three by the Seanad. The Commission, through the translation department, is responsible for periodic updates to An Caighdeán Oifigiúil, the official standard form of the Irish language.

See also
 Bicameralism
 List of Acts of the Oireachtas
 Records of members of the Oireachtas

References

External links

 

 
1937 establishments in Ireland
Ireland
Ireland
Ireland
Politics of the Republic of Ireland